Kahriz-e Ajam (also Romanized as Kahrīz-e ‘Ajam; also known as Kahrīzeh-ye ‘Ajam) is a Kurdish village in Hasanlu Rural District, Mohammadyar District, Naqadeh County, West Azerbaijan Province, Iran. At the 2006 census, its population was 441, in 109 families.

References 

Populated places in Naqadeh County